Gregory Kent Frizzell (born December 13, 1956) is a United States district judge of the United States District Court for the Northern District of Oklahoma.

Education and career

Born in Wichita, Kansas, Frizzell received a Bachelor of Arts degree from the University of Tulsa in 1981 and a Juris Doctor from the University of Michigan Law School in 1984. He was a law clerk for Judge Thomas Rutherford Brett of the United States District Court for the Northern District of Oklahoma from 1984 to 1986, thereafter entering private practice in Tulsa, Oklahoma from 1986 to 1995, and then serving as general counsel to the Oklahoma Tax Commission from 1995 to 1997. He was a District judge, 14th Judicial District, State of Oklahoma from 1997 to 2007.

Federal judicial service

On January 9, 2007, Frizzell was nominated by President George W. Bush to a seat on the United States District Court for the Northern District of Oklahoma vacated by Sven Erik Holmes. Frizzell was confirmed by the United States Senate on February 1, 2007, and received his commission on February 2, 2007.  He was elevated to Chief Judge on March 14, 2012, succeeding Judge Claire Eagan, who had been appointed to the Foreign Intelligence Surveillance Court. His term as Chief Judge concluded on March 14, 2019.

References

Sources

1956 births
Living people
Oklahoma state court judges
Judges of the United States District Court for the Northern District of Oklahoma
United States district court judges appointed by George W. Bush
21st-century American judges
University of Tulsa alumni
University of Michigan Law School alumni
People from Wichita, Kansas